State action immunity may refer to:

Act of state doctrine - legal doctrine that sovereign states must respect the independence of other sovereign states
Parker immunity doctrine - legal doctrine in U.S. courts that certain acts of the U.S. state governments are immune from antitrust liability
Sovereign immunity - legal doctrine that a sovereign state cannot commit a legal wrong